Neos or NEOS may refer to:

Neos (airline), an Italian airline
Neos (pistol), a type of Beretta pistol
Neos (record label), a German record label
Neos Finance, an Italian bank
NEOS Server, mathematical optimization software system
Near-Earth objects
NEOS – The New Austria, a political party in Austria
NEOS Library Consortium, a Canadian network of Libraries
TYPO3 Neos, an opensource content management system
Yamaha Neos, a moped
NeosVR, a virtual reality metaverse

See also
Neo (disambiguation)
 Neos Flow, a free and open source web application framework